Sanfaustino is a brand of effervescent mineral water.

Since 1894, Sanfaustino is sourced from a spring in Villa San Faustino, Province of Perugia, Umbria, Italy.

References

Bottled water brands
Carbonated water
Italian drinks
Italian brands
Soft drinks